Tender Age is a 1983 Soviet drama film directed by Valeri Isakov.

Plot 
The film tells about the teenagers Kir Lopukhov and Alyosha Mamykin who graduated from school and entered the artillery school. They only have three days left, for which they need to say goodbye to everyone, and Kir needs to find out about the fate of his girlfriend Olya. He meets her in the subway the day before departure, escorts her home, and in the morning leaves with Alyosha to the front.

Cast 
 Yevgeny Dvorzhetskiy
 Pavel Ilin as Aleksey Mamykin (as Pavel Kondratev)
 Alyona Belyak
 Natalya Kem
 Valentina Titova
 German Kachin
 Aleftina Evdokimova
 Aleksandr Arzhilovsky
 Artur Bogatov
 Rem Gekht

References

External links 
 

1983 films
1980s Russian-language films
Soviet drama films
1983 drama films